Cirsonella georgiana is a species of sea snail, a marine gastropod mollusk in the family Skeneidae.

Description
The height of the shell attains 2 mm.

Distribution
This species occurs in the Atlantic Ocean off Georgia, USA, at a depth of 805 m.

References

 Dall, W. H. 1927. Small shells from dredgings off the southeast coast of the United States by the United States Fisheries Steamer 'Albatross' in 1885 and 1886. Proceedings of the United States National Museum 70(2667): 1-134

External links
 To World Register of Marine Species

georgiana
Gastropods described in 1927